The  (National Consultative Commission on Human Rights, CNCDH) is a French governmental organization created in 1947 by an  from the Ministry of Foreign Affairs to monitor the respect for human rights in the country. It may acts as counsellor for the government and propose laws, and then survey the application of governmental measures and laws voted in Parliament.

The CNCDH is under the authority of the prime minister, and presided over by a director, Christine Lazerges, who can be summoned by the office of the P.M., or who can take the initiative in consulting with them. The 1990 Gayssot Act tasks the CNCDH of providing a yearly report on the state of the struggle against racism in France.

It is composed of
 state representatives, for the prime minister and for each 17 concerned ministers
 one deputy named by the president of the National Assembly
 one senator named by the president of the Senate
 one mediator of the Republic insuring relations between private persons and administrations
 representatives of 33 human rights NGOs
 representatives of trade unions confederations
 civil society personalities, representing for instance Catholic institutions, as well as Protestant, Muslim, Jewish, or university teachers, sociologists, etc.
 "experts" working in international bodies concerned with human rights issues

See also
  National human rights institutions
French Equal Opportunities and Anti-Discrimination Commission

References

External links
 

Anti-racism in France
Government agencies of France
Human rights in France